Yes Nurse! No Nurse! is a 2002 Dutch comedy musical film directed by Pieter Kramer, written by Frank Houtappels, and based on the 1967 television program by Annie M.G. Schmidt.

The film received a Golden Film (75,000 visitors) and a Platinum Film (200,000 visitors) in 2002.

Cast
Loes Luca as Zuster Klivia
Tjitske Reidinga as Jet
Waldemar Torenstra as Gerrit
Edo Brunner as Bertus
Lennart Vader as Bobby
Beppe Costa as Ingenieur
Paul Kooij as Buurman Boordevol
Paul de Leeuw as Wouter
Frits Lambrechts as Opa
Pierre van Duijl as Zorbo de Griek
Raymonde de Kuyper as De Drie Trudies
Trudy de Jong as De Drie Trudies
Trudie Lute as De Drie Trudies
Olga Zuiderhoek as Mevrouw de Rechter
Henk Stuurman as Mijnheer Azalea
Henny Westerveld as Mevrouw Azalea
Arjan Ederveen as Choreograaf
Dorijn Curvers as Koningin Beatrix

External links

 

2002 films
2000s Dutch-language films
2000s musical comedy films
Dutch musical comedy films
Films based on works by Annie M.G. Schmidt
2002 comedy films